Augusto Jorge Hughes (1931–1993) was an Argentine Air Force pilot. He was the second son of the Scottish descendant William Hughes and Josefa Settecase. He was born in Rosario, Santa Fé.
A J Hughes entered the Argentine Military Flying School "Escuela de Aviación Militar" in 1948, located in Córdoba. 
Over his flying career, he flew the British Gloster Meteor aircraft while he was a lieutenant and later on, the American Sabre F 86.

In 1966 he was sent as a captain to the US in order to bring the firsts A4B Skyhawks, which were destined to the 5th Air Brigade "V Brigada Aérea" in Villa Reynolds, San Luis.

By the beginning of the Falklands War in April 1982, he had become a Major Brigadier as the head of the Air Defense Command, organizing the air strike raids against the British Task Force. The Argentine air fleet was mainly composed of American jetplanes Douglas A4B-C Skyhawk, French Mirage, Israeli Dagger and the British bomber Canberra. The navy contributed with French Super Etendart and American A4Q Skyhawks.
Argentine Pucará and Italian Aermacchi operated from the local airports of the Falklands Islands.

Hughes also organized the deployment of the anti-aircraft artillery around the two main airfields. 

By the end of the war in June 1982, he was pointed by the surviving pilots to become the new Commander-in-Chief of the Argentine Air Force.

In 1983, elections were called and fivedays before president Alfonsin took power on December 10th, he retired and his pilot career came to an end.

References

1931 births
1993 deaths
Argentine Air Force brigadiers
Argentine military personnel of the Falklands War
Argentine people of British descent